Anegan is a 2015 Indian period  romantic thriller film directed by K. V. Anand, and produced by Kalpathi S. Aghoram, S. Ganesh, S. Suresh under the banner AGS Entertainment. The film features an ensemble cast starring Dhanush, Karthik and Amyra Dastur in lead roles, whilst Ashish Vidyarthi, Aishwarya Devan, Mukesh Tiwari, and Jagan, appear in supporting roles. Set in four different time periods, it is based on theme of reincarnation, which revolves around Ashwin (Dhanush) and Madhu (Amyra Dastur) who were lovers in their past lives, have been brought together in the present. 

The plot of this story inspired from the 1963 film Nenjam Marapathillai. Dhanush played four different characters in the film. The film's title is based on Tiruvacakam, written by poet Manikkavacakar. 

Principal photography commenced on 2 September 2013 at Puducherry. Filming continued in Vietnam, Cambodia, Malaysia and Burma, and some parts of India. and was completed on 15 September 2014. The film features music composed by Harris Jayaraj, with cinematography handled by Om Prakash and editing done by Anthony. The visual effects were handled by V. Srinivas Mohan.

After multiple postponements, Anegan was released on 13 February 2015. The film opened to positive reviews from critics, praising the performances of the lead actors(particularly Dhanush and Karthik), story, picturisation. The film was a moderate box office success. 

The film's Telugu dubbed version titled Anekudu was released on 27 February 2015. In 2016, the film was dubbed into Hindi as Anek by Goldmines Telefilms Pvt Ltd. In 2019, the film was dubbed into Bengali as Mon Majhi Re. In 2023, the film was dubbed into Malayalam as Anegan by Magic Frames Pvt Ltd.

Plot
'Munaruna' is a Tamil worker in 1960s Burma. His friend Saamuda falls in love with Mallika, but Mallika loves Munaruna. Munaruna saves Samudra, the daughter of a Burmese army general, from a Ferris wheel accident and they fall in love. When Mallika learns about this, she is devastated and marries Saamuda. The Burmese general disapproves of the union between Munaruna and Samudra, and revokes the privileges that the Tamil immigrants had until then. Violence breaks out and the Tamil nationals flee Burma. Munaruna and Samudra join the refugees on a ship with Saamuda and Mallika. When Samudra's father comes looking for her, Mallika spitefully reveals where they are hiding. As Samudra and Munaruna try to escape by diving into the ocean, Munaruna is shot and killed. Samudra handcuffs herself to Munaruna and drowns with him after promising to be together forever.

Back in Dr Radhika's office in present-day India, Samudra, now known as Madhu, tells Radhika has already met Saamuda and Mallika as Jagan and Meera, who are fellow programmers in the game development company where she works. Radhika dismisses this and gives Madhu medicine for stress. Madhu meets Ashwin, a new employee in her company, and seeing his resemblance to Munaruna, flirts with him. Kiran is their boss and he knows to extract work from employees with ease.

Meera hallucinates about ghosts that try to rape her and she jumps from the office window and dies. Madhu is disturbed and attends her therapy sessions with Radhika when she remembers her first birth where she was a princess in love with a king, who also resembles Ashwin. The two are killed by a traitorous officer in the king's army.

Madhu and Ashwin meet with a car accident and Madhu is admitted to a hospital. She dreams about overhearing policeman Gopinath's conversation about a couple named Kaali and Kalyani, when she intervenes and says that she knows their whereabouts. Once awake, she recites the dream to the policemen in the hospital and they are confused. Police commissioner Gopinath visits her and Madhu realizes that he looks like the police officer from her dream in the hospital. He says that the Kaali-Kalyani story was a missing person case that happened 25 years ago. Madhu claims that Kaali and Kalyani were killed and buried and takes Gopinath and Ashwin to a place where they dig up and find skeletons identified as remains of Kaali and Kalyani. Gopinath finds a ring engraved with the letter R on one of the skeletons. Ashwin is confused as to what R may mean.

Madhu returns to her therapy, and Kiran hears about her hallucinations and rushes to the clinic. Madhu hallucinates about her third birth, where she is Kalyani, who falls in love with a rowdy Kaali. She tells Kaali to confess to his crimes and serve out his time in jail in return for her hand in marriage. Her father is displeased and forcefully arranges her marriage with RaviKiran while Kaali is in jail. Kaali escapes from prison and meets Kalyani and they plan to elope, but RaviKiran finds out and offers to help them. He takes them to a secluded spot where he murders the couple out of jealousy and buries them. The finger with the ring belongs to RaviKiran and is amputated by Kaali during the fight. RaviKiran unknowingly buries it along with the dead bodies. 
 
RaviKiran later goes by the name Kiran - the same Kiran who owns the game company that Madhu and Ashwin work at. When he finds out that, as a child, Madhu learned the truth of Kali and Kalyani's death from Kalyani's father, he kidnaps and tries to kill her, and kills Kalyani's father. Ashwin finds video games with plots resembling the stories of Madhu's previous births and Meera's hallucination before her death. He finds a drug that the employees have been using to boost productivity, and realizes that Kiran has been giving illegal drugs to his employees to boost their creativity in order to profit with intense, uniquely themed games. As a side effect of the drug, his employees hallucinate, leading to Madhu's memories of her "past lives" and the recalling of the story of Kalyani as her own. Ashwin confronts Kiran, and in the ensuing fight, Kiran overpowers Ashwin. But Ashwin manages to defeat him and saves Madhu. Kiran is killed when a knife Ashwin threw into a tree falls onto Kiran's chest. Gopinath covers up the death as suicide, stating that Kiran killed himself for fear of dealing with the repercussions of his the illegal activities.

Ashwin and Madhu marry and honeymoon in Burma. As they playfully argue over whether Madhu's dreams had all been hallucinations or partly true, they pass by a log with a heart and the names of Munaruna and Samudra carved into it.

Cast 

 Dhanush in different roles as;
Ashwin, Works at Kiran's company in the system admin department and falls in love with Madhu
Kaaliswaran (Kaali), A painter in Madras 1987 who falls in love with Kalyani
Murugappa (Munaruna), A construction worker in Burma in 1962 and Samudra's lover
(Ilamaran), King Ilamaran in ancient Tamil Nadu (portrait in 'Roja Kadale' song only)
 Karthik as Ravikiran (Kiran), MD of a Gaming Company and the main antagonist
 Amyra Dastur (voice over by Raveena Ravi) in different roles as;
Madhumitha, a game designer at Kiran's company and fall in love with Ashwin
Samudra, a school student in Burma in 1962 and fall in love with Munaruna
Kalyani, a social activist in Madras 1987 who falls in love with Kaali 
Shenbagavalli, Princess Shenbagavalli in ancient Tamil Nadu (portrait in 'Roja Kadale' song only)
 Aishwarya Devan as 
Meera, a co-worker with Madhu
Mallika, Munaruna's one-side lover, and Saamuda's wife
 Ashish Vidyarthi as
Gopinath, Inspector of Police in Madras 1987 and later promoted as Commissioner in Chennai city, 
Head soldier of King Ilamaran in old anscent (portrait in roja kadale song only)
 Jagan as 
Jagan, Co-worker with Ashwin and Madhu
Saamuda, Munaruna's friend in Burma in 1962
 Mukesh Tiwari as 
Burma Police Officer in 1962 and Samudra's father
Radhakrishan, Madhu's uncle in present
 Thalaivasal Vijay as Moorthy (Kalyani's father)
 Vinaya Prasad as Madhumitha's mother
 Lena as Dr. Radhika and a woman in Burma who was fighting with an officer
 Shankar Krishnamurthy as Ashwin's father
 D. R. K. Kiran as Ranjith, Kiran's goon
 Revathi Sankar as Ravikiran's mother
 Veera Santhanam as Guruji
 K.R.G Sharad as Genie
 Bhawana Aneja as Samudra's mother (of Tamil descent) in Burma 1962
 Baby Vedhika
 Rajesh Milton
 Pankaj Rajan
 Baba Bhaskar (special appearance in the song "Danga Maari Oodhari")

 Vijay Vasanth

Production

Development 
In May 2013, K. V. Anand stated that he would collaborate with Dhanush for his next film, which Dhanush confirmed on his social network page. Anand joined hands with AGS Entertainment for the second time after Maattraan (2012), and it was confirmed that the production company would also distribute the film worldwide. Though it was rumoured to be titled as Thaara Thappatta Ready, it was later dismissed by the director. Dhanush was said to appear in four different looks in the film, and that he would not be playing the "moody-sombre" type-role he played in his previous films like Mayakkam Enna (2011). The film, a romantic entertainer laced with action was titled Anegan, meaning "the man with many shadows", according to Tamil poet Manikkavacakar, from his volume, Tiruvacakam. It was revealed that the story comprises multiple period set-ups, and in one of the segments, Dhanush goes back to his previous birth. The technical crew consisted of cinematography by Om Prakash, editing by Anthony, action by Kanal Kannan and the dialogues were written by Subha. As with most K. V. Anand films, Harris Jayaraj was once again signed to compose the musical score. Initially, K. V. Anand, narrated the story to Vijay first, but he could not commit the project, due to date issues, and suggested Dhanush's name.

Casting 
Alia Bhatt was rumoured to be playing the lead, before Amyra Dastur, a model who made her film debut in Issaq (2013) was later cast opposite Dhanush. In preparation for her role, she was asked to see Tamil films and also took Tamil lessons from Dhanush to get her dialogues right. Amyra was further reported to be performing stunts for the film. In an interview to IANS, Amyra said that she would portray three different roles in the film. Karthik was signed to play the role of a love guru to Dhanush, for a part, similar to the role portrayed by Santhanam in Theeya Velai Seiyyanum Kumaru (2013), and also sport a look similar to that of Ajith's look in Mankatha (2011). Baby Vedhika of Nirnayam (2013) fame is also playing a role. Actress Aishwarya Devan was selected to play the second heroine in the film. Actors Atul Kulkarni and Ashish Vidyarthi were selected to play supporting roles. Malayalam actress Lena was also selected to play a supporting role in the film.

Characters 
Dhanush was said to appear in four different looks in the film since the film is set across different time periods. Furthermore, K. V. Anand had stated that Dhanush will be sporting a hairdo, for the character King Ilamaran, similar to Kamal Haasan's look in the film, Tik Tik Tik (1981).

Filming 
Principal photography began on 2 September 2013 at Puducherry. It was reported that the film would be shot across locations such as Vietnam, Cambodia, Malaysia, and Burma among many other countries. In Malaysia, a football game scene was shot in the oldest English school in South East Asia, Penang Free School. The second schedule took place in Hyderabad. where a song sequence was choreographed by Baba Baskar. According to unit members, Amyra stunned the unit with her perfect lip sync for Tamil dialogues and that she overshadowed the hero in some places as well. By 29 May 2014, 90% of the movie was shot, including 3 song sequences. Another song sequence and part of the climax were shot on a farmland, spread over 100 acres, near Puducherry. During the process of shooting the climax, which was reported to be a racy stunt sequence, Dhanush injured his leg severely, because of which shooting was halted for 3 weeks, after which Dhanush recovered and shooting proceeded as scheduled. The team then went to Scotland to shoot for a song sequence. In mid-August 2014, the filming was almost done with just a song left to be shot in Chennai on 1 September 2014. On 26 August 2014, Dhanush stated that he had started dubbing for the film. On 15 September 2014, Anand confirmed that the shooting of the film was completed.

Themes and influences 
M. Suganth of The Times of India in his review stated that the film "[had] traces of Magadheera, Enakkul Oruvan, Cloud Atlas and The Fountain" but attributed the comparison "mainly due to the reincarnation theme."

Music 

The film's soundtrack is scored by K. V. Anand's regular collaborator Harris Jayaraj, which was his first and only collaboration with Dhanush. The soundtrack album features six tracks, written by Vairamuthu, Kabilan Vairamuthu, Rokesh and C. S. Amudhan. Recording of the songs took place within April to August 2014. The album was released by Sony Music on 1 November 2014, through  iTunes and later released at a launch event held on 2 November 2014, at the Suryan FM 93.5 Radio Station, in the presence of the film's cast and crew. The soundtrack album received positive reviews, and the song "Danga Maari Oodhari" became a chartbuster upon release.

Marketing 
The first look poster was released on 1 September 2013. The title font was designed to resemble a gamepad. A new title design and additional stills and posters were made available on 24 October 2013. The official teaser of the film was released on 22 October 2014, coinciding with Diwali. The official trailer was released on 13 January 2015.

Release

Theatrical 
Anegan was touted to be one of the biggest film release for Dhanush. Initially, the film was rumoured to be released on 22 October 2014, coinciding with Diwali. However, the makers announced that, the film will not be released on Diwali, clashing with Vijay-starrer Kaththi and Vishal-starrer Poojai, which was scheduled to release on the same date. In September 2014, the makers announced that the film would be released in November 2014. Furthermore, the uncertainty over the release of Rajinikanth-starrer Lingaa, and Vikram-starrer I, led the makers to push the film's release after Pongal, which falls on 15 January 2015. In December 2014, the film cleared the censors. The film was later scheduled to release on 29 January 2015, but due to the release of Ajith Kumar-starrer Yennai Arindhaal (2015), which was postponed to 6 February 2015, the makers pushed its release to end February. Since the 2015 Cricket World Cup, is scheduled to be held from 14 February 2015 in Australia, the makers brought forward its release to 13 February 2015, which also coincides with the Valentine's Day weekend.

Before its release being delayed to 2015, the film was listed by Behindwoods in its "Top 10 most Anticipated films of 2014". The film opened in nearly 1000 screens worldwide, plus 500 screens in Tamil Nadu, making it the biggest release in Dhanush film. The film got exemption from entertainment tax levied by the state government.

Distribution 
The film's Tamil Nadu distribution rights, were bought by Dhanush's home banner, Wunderbar Films. The Kerala distribution rights were bought by E4 Entertainment. Fox Star Studios, acquired the Karnataka distribution rights. The overseas rights were bought by Ayngaran International. In US, Atmus Entertainment bought the distribution rights, and released in 160 screens. The film was dubbed in Telugu as Anekudu, and was released on 27 February 2015.

Home media 
The satellite rights of the film were sold to Sun TV.

Television broadcast 
The film's television premiere took place on 14 April 2015, coinciding with Tamil New Year festival. This caused their fans becoming displeased, and requested to postpone the premiere of the film. Despite that, the channel went ahead with the premiere.

Reception

Box office
The film grossed  in the second weekend.

Critical response
M. Suganth of The Times of India rated the film 4 stars out of 5 and stated, "Anegan is pure camp but also a hugely entertaining one". Nicy V.P of The International Business Times rated it 3 stars out of 5 and wrote "Anegan is a brilliant attempt by KV Anand, he tried a new visual style to tell his story and to an extend he was successful too". Udhav Naig of The Hindu wrote, "With most commercial films recycling the usual plot and its many tropes, full credit to K.V. Anand for striving to narrate a banal plot – full of déjà vu and clichés – in an enterprising manner." Another reviewer Sudhir Srinivasan wrote "Anegan...is a complex story told simplistically. Had the complexity been retained, and had the masala spoon been of lesser size, it would have made for a great film. For now, though, it will have to satisfy itself with being a hit film." Rediff.com stated, "The narrative technique and interesting screenplay keep things moving at a brisk pace. But on the downside, there are far too many songs and several unanswered questions". Sify wrote, "Gorgeously shot, crisply edited, and handsomely mounted, KV Anand's Anegan is a fast-paced rollicking adventure ride that is gripping till the very end".

Indiaglitz rated the film 3 out of 5 and wrote "Although not a masala perse, Anegan savours all tastes. There is action, a little bit of revenge, lighthearted comedy, smothering love, all served with a twist from the usual." Behindwoods.com rated it 2.75 out of 5 and stated "Though there are lots of questions which can be raised on the story and happenings, the overall screenplay and editing keeps you engaged by and large." Gautaman Bhaskaran of The Hindustan Times rated it 2 stars out of 5 and stated "If Anegan is a mishmash of many films that one has seen over the years, the performances are passé. Yes, a new look Karthik may be a novelty, but Dhanush appears to be disinterested in changing his style or his roles."

References

External links 
 

2015 films
2010s Tamil-language films
Films about reincarnation
Indian nonlinear narrative films
Films scored by Harris Jayaraj
Films shot in Puducherry
Films shot in Vietnam
Films shot in Cambodia
Films shot in Telangana
Films shot in Malaysia
Films shot in Myanmar
Films set in Myanmar
Films shot in Scotland
Films set in 1962
Films set in 1987
Films set in 2015
Indian romantic thriller films
2010s romantic thriller films